Hydrocorynidae is a family of cnidarians belonging to the order Anthoathecata.

Genera:
 Hydrocoryne Stechow, 1908 
 Samuraia Mangin, 1991

References

 
Capitata
Cnidarian families